The following is a list of the largest cities in Malaysia by population, based on the 2020 National Census. For each city, only the population within the city proper, defined by the area under the jurisdiction of the respective city councils, is taken.

References

See also 
 List of cities in Malaysia
 List of cities and towns in Malaysia by population

Cities
Cities  by population
Malaysia